Walter Butler Homestead, also known as Butlersbury, is a historic home located near Fonda in Montgomery County, New York.  It is a -story, 40-foot-long, 30-foot-wide, 18th-century farmhouse.  It has a limestone block foundation and cellar and attic.  The dwelling was built by Lt. Walter Butler (ca. 1670–1760), father of John Butler (1728-1796).

It was added to the National Register of Historic Places in 1976.

References

Houses on the National Register of Historic Places in New York (state)
Houses in Montgomery County, New York
National Register of Historic Places in Montgomery County, New York